Giulio Mulas (born 9 November 1996) is an Italian football player. He plays for San Donato.

Club career
He made his Serie C debut for Tuttocuoio on 17 September 2014 in a game against Pro Piacenza.

On 11 September 2019, he joined Serie D club San Donato.

References

External links
 

1996 births
Living people
People from Poggibonsi
Italian footballers
Association football defenders
Italy youth international footballers
A.C. Tuttocuoio 1957 San Miniato players
Parma Calcio 1913 players
U.S. Pistoiese 1921 players
Piacenza Calcio 1919 players
Serie C players
Serie D players
Sportspeople from the Province of Siena
Footballers from Tuscany